Arishina Kumkuma (Kannada: ಅರಿಶಿನ ಕುಂಕುಮ) is a 1970 Indian Kannada film, directed by K. S. L. Swamy (Ravee) and produced by H. V. Nagendrappa, M. V. Dodda Veeranna, K. V. Nagabhushana Shetty, K. G. Veeranna, Mallikarjunappa and Thippeswamy. The film stars Kalpana, Kalyan Kumar, Rajesh and K. S. Ashwath in the lead roles. The film has musical score by Vijaya Bhaskar. The film was remade in Tamil as Deivamsam (1972) with AVM Rajan and Sasikumar.

Cast

Kalpana as Radha Devi
Kalyan Kumar as Raja "Raju" N. K.
Rajesh as Shankar
K. S. Ashwath as Nanjundaiah, Radha's father
Dwarakish as Gundu Rao
H. R. Shastry
Thoogudeepa Srinivas as Balu
Shailesh Kumar
M. Jayashree as Nanjundaiah's sister
Papamma as Kamala
R. T. Rama as Saroja
B. Jaya
P. B. Sreenivas as himself (cameo)
Srinath in a cameo
B. V. Radha in a cameo
Shylashri in a cameo
Kodanda Rao
G. M. Nanjappa

Soundtrack
The music was composed by Vijaya Bhaskar.

References

External links
 
 

1970 films
1970s Kannada-language films
Films scored by Vijaya Bhaskar
Films directed by K. S. L. Swamy
Kannada films remade in other languages